Tülin is a common feminine Turkish given name. In Turkish, "Tülin" means "Halo around the moon". "Tülin", "Aylin", and "Ayla" are synonymous given names. Beside that meaning, "Tülin" also means "Mirror", according to TDK (Türk Dil Kurumu).

People
 Tülin Altıntaş (born 1982), Turkish volleyball player.
 Tülin Özen, Turkish actress 
 Tülin Şahin (born 1980), a Turkish fashion designer, TV presenter, actress, author and top model

Turkish feminine given names